KSYZ-FM (107.7 FM, referred to as "107.7 The Island") is a radio station broadcasting an adult Hits format. Licensed to Grand Island, Nebraska, United States, the station first went on the air in 1982, serving the Grand Island-Kearney area. Initially more commonly a Top 40 station during the 1980s, which it was at the time of launch, but was known as the only rock station broadcasting from Grand Island; although broadcasting on 107.7 MHz, it was first advertised as "FM 108", it was later "Great 108" in the mid-1980s, and then "Sunny 108" years later. The station's format was kept secret prior to launch. The station rebranded as 107.7 The Island, Real Music Variety at noon on Monday, August 31, 2009. The station is currently owned by NRG Media.

References

External links

SYZ-FM
NRG Media radio stations